Badalamenti is an Italian surname. People with the surname include:

 Angelo Badalamenti (1937–2022), American composer
 Gaetano Badalamenti (1923–2004), Italian mobster
 Vincent Badalamenti (born 1958), American mobster
 Vito Badalamenti (born 1957), Italian mobster

Italian-language surnames